Filipino indie pop band December Avenue has released one studio album, two extended play (EPs), eighteen singles, and one music video. The group is composed of Zel Bautista on vocals and guitars, Jem Manuel on guitars, Don Gregorio on bass, Jet Danao on drums and backing vocals, and Gelo Cruz on keyboards and backing vocals.

Albums

Studio albums

Extended plays

Singles

Covers

References

External links
 Official website
 December Avenue at AllMusic
 

Discographies of Filipino artists
Pop music group discographies
Rock music group discographies